Brzeźno Szlacheckie  (Cashubian Brzézno Szlachecczé)() is a village in Gmina Lipnica, Bytów County, Pomeranian Voivodeship, in northern Poland.

From 1975 to 1998 the village was in Słupsk Voivodeship.

It has a population of 505.

References

External links

Map of the Gmina Lipnica

Villages in Bytów County
Pomeranian Voivodeship (1919–1939)